The 1965–66 Liga Gimel season saw 175 clubs competing in 14 regional divisions for promotion to Liga Bet.

Hapoel Hatzor, Beitar Acre, Hapoel Beit She'an, Hapoel Shefa-'Amr, Hapoel Atlit, Hapoel Zikhron Ya'akov, Hapoel Kfar Yona, Hapoel Rosh HaAyin, David Tel Aviv, Maccabi Ramla, Beitar Beit Dagan, Maccabi Kiryat Gat, Beitar Ashdod and Hapoel Yeruham won their regional divisions and qualified for the Promotion play-offs.

At the Promotion play-offs, Hapoel Beit She'an, Beitar Acre, Hapoel Atlit and Hapoel Zikhron Ya'akov were promoted to Liga Bet from the North play-offs, whilst Maccabi Ramla, Beitar Beit Dagan, Hapoel Rosh HaAyin and David Tel Aviv were promoted to Liga Bet from the South play-offs.

15 clubs did not finish the season due to suspensions and withdrawals.

Upper Galilee Division

Western Galilee Division

Valleys Division

Nazareth Division

Haifa Division

Samaria Division

Sharon Division

Petah Tikva Division

Tel Aviv Division

Jaffa Division

Central Division

Jerusalem Division

South Division

Negev Division

Promotion play-offs

North play-offs

South play-offs

See also
1965–66 Liga Leumit
1965–66 Liga Alef
1965–66 Liga Bet

References
Liga Gimel competed with the World Cup games: Who will finish first... (Page 4) Moshe Kashtan, Hadshot HaSport, 7 August 1966, archive.football.co.il 

Liga Gimel seasons
4